Félix Carbray (December 22, 1835 – December 20, 1907) was a Canadian politician.

He was elected to the Legislative Assembly of Quebec in the 1881 election for the riding of Québec-Ouest. A Conservative, he was defeated in 1886. He was acclaimed in 1892 and re-elected in 1897. He did not run in 1900.

References

External links
 

1835 births
1907 deaths
Conservative Party of Quebec MNAs